Michael Hampton (born 1956) is an American funk/rock guitarist.

Michael Hampton may also refer to:
 Michael Hampton (punk musician), hardcore punk guitarist from Washington, D.C.
 Michael Hampton, better known under his stage name DJ Magic Mike
 Mike Hampton (Michael William Hampton, born 1972), American baseball player
 Mike Hampton (baseball coach) (Michael Anthony Hampton, born 1972), American college baseball coach